Alan Splet (December 31, 1939 – December 2, 1994) was an American sound designer and sound editor known for his collaborations with director David Lynch on Eraserhead, The Elephant Man, Dune, and Blue Velvet.

Due to being legally blind, Splet rarely traveled and mainly worked from Berkeley, California. In 1980, he won an Oscar for his work on the film The Black Stallion. He did not attend the Academy Award ceremony and became the butt of several jokes by host Johnny Carson throughout the remainder of the telecast. He was later nominated for the Academy Award for Best Sound Mixing for Never Cry Wolf. In 1995, The Motion Picture Sound Editors union posthumously honored Splet with a Lifetime Achievement Award for his creative contributions to the field of cinema audio.

Splet was married to sound effects designer Ann Kroeber, and collaborated with her on most of his projects from 1979 until his death in 1994.

Selected filmography

References

External links
 
 "Eraserheads" the last part of Christopher Cook's "Dancing Shadows" series about sound design in film, originally aired on BBC Radio 4, 20.2.2001, repeated 25.3.2002
 Eraserhead Interview

1939 births
1994 deaths
American blind people
Special Achievement Academy Award winners
Best Sound Editing Academy Award winners
American sound designers